The 49th Guldbagge Awards ceremony, presented by the Swedish Film Institute, honored the best Swedish films of 2013 and took place January 20, 2014, at Cirkus in Stockholm. During the ceremony, the jury presented Guldbagge Awards (commonly referred to as Bagge) in 19 categories. The ceremony was televised in the Sweden by SVT, with actress and comedian Sissela Kyle hosting the show for the third time. The ceremony also celebrated the prize's 50th anniversary.

Waltz for Monica won four awards including Best Actress for Edda Magnason and Best Director for Per Fly. The Reunion won two awards for Best Film and Best Screenplay. Other winners included We Are the Best! with two awards, and Nobody Owns Me, Hotell, The Tenderness, Belleville Baby, On Suffocation, Blue Is the Warmest Colour, Sanctuary, Faro and Shed No Tears with one.

The jury 
Through discussions the jury appoints the winners of the Guldbagge Award among the three nominees in all price categories, except for the Honorary Award which is appointed directly by the Swedish Film Institute's board. The jury consisted this year of Jannike Åhlund (chairman), Anna Carlson (actress and chairman of The Swedish Union for Performing Arts and Film), Bengt Forslund (producer and writer), Jan Holmberg (ceo, Ingmar Bergman Foundation), Anne-Marie Söhrman Fermelin (consultant of Film Stockholm/Filmbasen and producer), Kathrine Windfeld (director), Farnaz Arbabi (director and playwright), Sylvia Ingemarsdotter (film editor) and Marcus Lindeen (director and playwright).

Winner and nominees 
The nominees for the 49th Guldbagge Awards were announced on January 3, 2014 in Stockholm, by the Swedish Film Institute.

Films with the most nominations were Waltz for Monica with eleven, followed by Shed No Tears with nine. The winners were announced during the awards ceremony on January 20, 2014.

Awards 

Winners are listed first and highlighted in 'boldface.

 Multiple nominations and awards 

The following films received one or multiple nominations:
 Eleven: Waltz for Monica Nine: Shed No Tears Four: Hotell and The Reunion Three: The Hundred-Year-Old Man Who Climbed Out the Window and Disappeared, Easy Money III: Life Deluxe and We Are the Best! Two: Belleville Baby One: Nobody Owns Me, En gång om året, Forest of the Dancing Spirits, Faro, No Burqas Behind Bars, Me Seal, Baby, On Suffocation and Äta lunchThe following four films received multiple awards:
 Four: Waltz for Monica Two: The Reunion and We Are the Best!''

References

External links 

 

2014 in Swedish cinema
2013 film awards
Guldbagge Awards ceremonies
2010s in Stockholm
January 2014 events in Europe